Democratic media is a form of media organization that strives to have the principles of democracy underlying not only the production of content, but also the organization of the entire project.

Definition of the term 

Democratic Media is the idea that the media should be organized along democratic lines rather that strictly commercial (or any other form of media arrangement) lines. A functioning democratic media would aim for transparency, inclusiveness, one-person-one-vote and other key concepts of democracy as principals of operation: "This is a media whose primary objectives are to inform, be open, independent and be accountable." This is in contrast to the belief that media should be run by commercial operations and with the objective of making a profit and the assumption that the media invariably reflects the opinions and values of the owner and advertisers. Advocates contrast it to state-run operations where the media reflects the value system of the state itself. Edward S Herman suggested the form that democratic media would take:

Background of the term 
The idea of democratic media stems from the belief that media is a vital part of a democratic society. Robert W. McChesney, writing for the Boston Review in 2008, commented:

Therefore, if media is vital for democracy, democratic media argues that media itself needs to be organized along different lines to the existing forms. McChesney also states:

The idea of democratic media is still in its infancy, according to Carroll & Hackett (2006 where they term it "democratic media activism" however the idea does have older roots; In Triumph of the Market: Essays on Economics, Politics, and the Media Edward S Herman asserted that democratic media was a condition of democracy:

The term has been used to describe a number of new media projects such as Wikipedia and the Indymedia movement when asked how they saw themselves;

Democratic media differs from similar (and related) concepts such as citizen media, media democracy and independent media (aka alternative media) in that it puts as much emphasis on the organization of the media project as it does on the content. (Note that this definition means that an independent media or citizen media project can also be a democratic media project, but being an independent media or citizen media project does not mean it is automatically a form of democratic media.  It also means there could be a project that promotes the concepts of media democracy without it itself explicitly claiming to be a form of democratic media.)  For a media project to be considered democratic media it must have (or strive towards) the following characteristics:
Open publishing
Transparency (humanities)
Accountability
Open access (publishing)
Non-commercial

Need for Democratic Media 
Community media is any form of media that functions in service of a community such as a local newspaper or radio station. A lot of these community media sources are dying off as consumers demand for them dwindle. The use of community media could become popular again if they implemented the ideas of democratic media. Letting the people have a say in the media they consume could help to regain viewership in community media and fight against the new wave of large media outlets. Allowing this mass participation through democratic media could cause the people to become more involved in their own democracies and bring light to the issues that they care about. Some argue that these large media outlets have also had a detrimental effect on our society as they sometimes care more about the ratings and money than reporting the facts.

Media has also had a large effect on history. Many different social rights movements in the early 2000s (such as the extension of citizenship rights) had different types of media as a driving factor in causing change. Individual medias can utilize the power they hold over the public's perception to influence their opinions and choices. The mass media is one of the main factors that determine the public opinion which oftentimes leads to public action. Some argue that utilizing more democratic media  sources would help to inform the people and bring the power back to the people by letting them influence the media that they consume.

Others believe that in order to truly be considered a democracy a country must have a democratic media. These believers argue that a country who considers themselves a democracy should not have a media controlled by the powerful and privileged elite. They argue that a media run in this way will misinform the public and show what will support their own agendas. A system run this way could have catastrophic effects on society and the publics perception as they will only be told what the elite want. This could lead to misinformation, poverty, or even war.

Democratic Media Struggles

Africa 
Zimbabwe sees journalists arrested regularly. Many of the news sources within the country have been banned such as The Daily News being banned in 2003 and the weekly Tribune being banned in 2004.  These news outlets were all shut down by the government for various different reasons such as violations to the Access to Information and Protection of Privacy Act and for hiring unaccredited journalists. The Zimbabwean government also limits the international press's ability to report from within the country.

In 2010, South Africa had a large stalemate over a proposed bill between the African National Congress (ANC) and print media who both had differing views on the role of media within society. The ANC argued that local news often misreported the news and the local print media argued that they accurately depicted the news and wanted to move towards a more democratic media. The argument displayed two differing views on the role of media within society. The ANC believed that media should have little freedom and be controlled by the government while the media sources believed that media should have complete freedom and be based on democracy. Within Zimbabwe, there are many policies made by the government that can sometimes favor certain demographics over others. Often when the media reports on these policies to inform the public, they are threatened or shut down by the government.

See also 
Citizen media
Independent media
Indymedia
Media democracy
Propaganda model

References 

Mass media issues
Alternative media